Wocker is a river of Mecklenburg-Vorpommern, Germany. It flows into the Elde in Parchim.

See also
List of rivers of Mecklenburg-Vorpommern

Rivers of Mecklenburg-Western Pomerania
Rivers of Germany